Amylmetacresol (AMC) is an antiseptic used to treat infections of the mouth and throat. It is used as an active pharmaceutical ingredient in Strepsils, Cēpacol, Gorpils and Lorsept throat lozenges, typically in combination with dichlorobenzyl alcohol, another antiseptic.

Medical uses
The lozenges are used to treat sore throat and minor mouth and throat infections including pharyngitis and gingivitis.

A 2017 meta-analysis found that the combination of AMC with dichlorobenzyl alcohol has a modest advantage over un-medicated lozenges regarding pain relief.

Contraindications
No contraindications are known apart from hypersensitivity to the substance.

Adverse effects
Amylmetacresol sometimes causes soreness of the tongue. Hypersensitivity reactions are very rare and show symptoms such as nausea or dyspepsia, although it is not entirely clear which side effects are caused by AMC and which by dichlorobenzyl alcohol or other ingredients of the lozenges.

AMC has a low toxicity with an LD50 of 1500 mg/kg body weight (in rats).

Overdose
No cases of overdosing have been reported. It is not expected to cause symptoms other than gastrointestinal discomfort.

Interactions
No interactions with other drugs are known.

Pharmacology

Mechanism of action
Amylmetacresol is an antibacterial and antiviral substance. It also blocks sodium channels in a manner similar to local anaesthetics. It has a Rideal-Walker coefficient of 250.

Pharmacokinetics
The substance is rapidly absorbed. It is oxidised to a carboxylic acid, glucuronidated, and quickly eliminated via the kidneys.

Chemistry
AMC is a derivative of m-cresol, with a pentyl group attached to the sixth carbon atom. It is soluble in water, ethanol, acetone, diethylether, and oil.

See also
 2,4-Dichlorobenzyl alcohol
 Hexylresorcinol
 Cetylpyridinium chloride
 Dequalinium

References

External links
 
 

Antiseptics
Alkylphenols